Borneacanthus is a genus of flowering plants belonging to the family Acanthaceae.

Its native range is Borneo.

Species:

Borneacanthus angustifolius 
Borneacanthus grandifolius 
Borneacanthus mesargyreus 
Borneacanthus paniculatus 
Borneacanthus parvus 
Borneacanthus stenothyrsus

References

Acanthaceae
Acanthaceae genera